The Russian spring punch is a highball cocktail of vodka and liqueur, per IBA specified ingredients. The International Bartenders Association lists the beverage in its New Era Drinks category.

The Russian spring punch was created in London, England by Dick Bradsell in the 1980s. He claims not to remember which bar he was working at at the time, but tells the story of how he created the recipe for personal friends wishing to hold a cocktail party while minimizing the amount of money they had to spend on alcohol. Participants were provided with the vodka, cassis, sugar syrup and lemon juice, and were asked to bring their own sparkling wine. It is named for the russian vodka, and the Tom Collins, which is a spring drink.

See also
 Black Russian
 White Russian
 List of cocktails

References

Cocktails with vodka
Cocktails with liqueur
Cocktails with lemon juice